Sunday Report may refer to:

Sunday Report (Canadian TV series)
Sunday Report (Hong Kong TV series)
Sandys Report 1957 Defence White Paper